Tulu may refer to:

People
Derartu Tulu (born 1972), Ethiopian long-distance runner
Walid Yacoubou (born 1997), Togolese footballer nicknamed "Tulu"

India
Tulu calendar, traditional solar calendar generally used in the regions of southwest Karnataka and the Kasaragod district
Tulu cinema, part of the film industry in India
Tulu Gowda, a subsect of the Vokkaliga community in Karnataka
Tulu Kingdom, a small kingdom during the period of Puranas, now thought to be the Tulu-speaking areas in southwestern Karnataka
Tulu language, a language spoken in Karnataka and in the Kasaragod district
Tulu Nadu, a Tulu-speaking region spread over parts of present Karnataka state and the Kasaragod district
Tulu people, an ethnolinguistic group native to the coastal Karnataka region
Tulu script, another name for Tigalari script
Tuluva dynasty, a medieval kingdom in Southern India.
 Tuluva people

Azerbaijan
Tülü, Balakan, village
Tülü, Lerik, village

Other places
Tulú, a corregimiento in Panama
Tülü, Saimbeyli, a village in Turkey
Tulu Bolo, a town in Ethiopia

Language and nationality disambiguation pages